Kaloyan Cvetkov (born 27 September 1988) is a Bulgarian footballer, who plays for PFC Panayot Volov as a midfielder.

External links
Profile at Guardian Football
footmercato profile 

1988 births
Living people
Bulgarian footballers
First Professional Football League (Bulgaria) players
PFC Spartak Varna players

Association football midfielders